"Love All" is a song by Canadian rapper Drake from his sixth studio album Certified Lover Boy (2021). It features American rapper Jay-Z and was produced by Oz, Dez Wright and Leon Thomas III.

Composition
The song contains a sample of "Life After Death (Intro)" by The Notorious B.I.G. In the lyrics, Drake and Jay-Z point out the negative factors associated with their fame, including a lack of loyalty toward them and people taking their kindness for weakness. Much of the content has been regarded as referring especially to Kanye West.

Critical reception
The song was met with a mostly negative reception. Sam Moore of The Independent called it "drumless inertia". Writing for The Guardian, Alim Kheraj described the song as "sparse and underwhelming" and Jay-Z's verse "sleepy, barely present". Jeff Ihaza of Rolling Stone deemed the song as "overly dramatic" and particularly criticized the disses toward Kanye West, writing, "It carries all of the intensity of high school bickering, but with somehow even lower stakes."

Conversely, Erika Marie of HotNewHipHop gave the song a "Very Hottttt" rating.

Charts

References

2021 songs
Drake (musician) songs
Jay-Z songs
Songs written by Drake (musician)
Songs written by Jay-Z
Songs written by Oz (record producer)
Songs written by Leon Thomas III
Songs written by Khristopher Riddick-Tynes
Songs written by the Notorious B.I.G.
Songs written by Sean Combs
Songs written by Stevie J
Diss tracks